Hydropic swelling is intracellular edema of keratinocytes, often seen with viral infections.

See also 
 Skin lesion
 Skin disease
 List of skin diseases

References

Dermatologic terminology